Bodi is a Nepali word for boiled beans. Bodi ko Achar is one of the delicacies of the Newari people. It is a chutney made by mixing asparagus beans with spices .

See also

References

Newari cuisine
Legume dishes
Pickles